The Los Gatos Creek Trail is a 9.7-mile (15.6 km) pedestrian and bicycle trail that runs through western Santa Clara County in California, from Lexington Reservoir in Los Gatos, California through Campbell, California to Meridian Avenue in San Jose, California alongside Los Gatos Creek. The trail is heavily used.

The route
Starting from the south and progressing north:

Lexington to Los Gatos

There are two trails between Lexington Reservoir and downtown Los Gatos. The portion of the trail on the west side of the creek is the Los Gatos Creek Trail proper and is a smooth, wide, unpaved trail on an old railway bed. The portion on the east side is the Jones Trail near the reservoir, connecting to the Flume Trail, which leads to downtown Los Gatos. The north portion of this trail is for pedestrians only as it is windy and goes down to the stream level in several places.  Jones Road is an alternative for cyclists. The Jones and Flume trail connect with Novitiate Park and the St. Joseph's Hill Open Space Preserve. There is a limited amount of parking available in Novitiate Park and at the end of Jones Road.

The first half-mile offers a significant drop in elevation.

Downtown Los Gatos
As the trail reaches downtown Los Gatos, the first access point is at the Main Street bridge. The trail then passes the 1854 Forbes Mill, which houses a history museum. It then crosses from the east to the west of Highway 17 via a dedicated bridge. From this point northward the trail is paved. Next, there is an access point immediately behind the Old Town shopping area.  to the north, there is an access point and a parking lot with a few spaces meant for the trail next to a small park north of Old Town that can be reached via Miles Avenue.

Vasona Lake County Park
The trail next runs through Oak Meadow Park and Vasona Park. Attractions in this pair of parks include the Billy Jones Wildcat Railroad and a Lockheed T-33A airplane on which kids can crawl. The trail follows the east side of the lake and goes up and over the dam.

Los Gatos Creek County Park
After travelling under Highway 85, the trail next enters Los Gatos Creek County Park.  Attractions in this park include fishing, a casting pond, and a dog park. A bike/pedestrian bridge across Highway 17 connects to the trail at this point; the bridge leads to Bascom Avenue in the city of San Jose.

Campbell Park and Downtown Campbell access
The trail goes through Campbell Park.  Downtown Campbell is only a three block walk to the west from the trail via Campbell Avenue.  The trail is present on both sides of the creek from Campbell Park south to the bridge just north of San Tomas Expressway/Camden Avenue. A parallel mountain bike single-track trail exists east of the trail on the east side of the creek between the trail and the freeway.

The Pruneyard
The trail next passes by the back of the Pruneyard Shopping Center in Campbell.  The access point is at the northwest corner of the complex, behind the parking structure. The Pruneyard has offices, shops, restaurants, and a movie theater.

Willow Glen endpoint
The trail next heads through San Jose's Willow Glen neighborhood, ending at Meridian Avenue. No trail exists between the terminus onto Meridian and the northern segment, off Lonus.

Northern section of the trail into Downtown San Jose
The City of San Jose suggests that trail users connect from the main trail to the northernmost segment by exiting the main trail at Willow, approximately  short of the terminus on Meridian, then proceeding north/east along Willow to Lonus via Glen Eyrie and Lincoln.

The northernmost section of trail connects Lonus and Dupont streets. The resumed trail travels north under I-280. This section provides a key link for the trail as a whole, connecting Willow Glen and Downtown and removing the previous surface-street crossing of I-280. This section continues past the Del Monte Dog Park and terminates at Dupont Avenue, a stub street running parallel to West San Carlos Street, approximately  directly south of the San Jose Diridon station. The terminus of the trail at Dupont is immediately below a set of stairs that allows easy access to the bridge that carries West San Carlos Street over the creek and the Caltrain lines. This bridge connects the trail into central downtown San Jose.

Connections to the Los Gatos Creek Trail

Connection to the Guadalupe River Trail into Downtown San Jose
The Guadalupe River Trail can be reached by travelling east on the nice bike trail on Willow Avenue, turning left onto Delmas Avenue and then right onto Virginia Avenue.  Travel east on W. Virginia Avenue until you reach the termination of the Guadalupe River Trail, which is on the northside of W. Virginia Ave, just east of the bridge over highway 87.

Connection to the Three Creeks Trail and future plans for improving the connection to downtown San Jose
The city of San Jose has been actively developing the Three Creeks Trail on an abandoned former WPR/UPRR rail spur.  Most of that trail is complete.  The northern end of this rail spur crosses Lonus Avenue, is part of the defined project, and is awaiting the opening of the bridge over the creek just south of Lonus Avenue.  Opening this bridge will allow connection to the northern section of the Los Gatos Creek Trail without requiring travel on busy Lincoln Avenue.

Connection to the White Oaks Avenue neighborhood
A bridge across highway 17 connects to the trail at the south end of Los Gatos Creek County Park.

Connection to the Los Gatos-Saratoga Road bike lanes
The connection is via University Avenue and Miles Avenue, which is south of Los Gatos-Saratoga Road.  The Town of Los Gatos has applied for grants to improve this access.

Mileage and elevation
 0.0 – Alma Bridge Road (660 ft)
 1.5 – Main Street (400 ft)
 2.1 – Miles Road
 2.3 – Saratoga-Los Gatos Road (Highway 9)
 2.9 – Roberts Road
 4.3 – Vasona Dam (300 ft)
 4.7 – Lark Avenue
 6.3 – Los Gatos Creek County Park (200 ft)
 6.5 – Camden Avenue / San Tomas Expressway
 7.7 – Campbell Avenue (170 ft)
 8.0 – Highway 17
 8.4 – Hamilton Avenue
 8.6 – Bascom Avenue
 9.2 – Leigh Avenue
 10.0 – Meridian Avenue (120 ft)

References

External links
 Santa Clara County Parks site including maps
 Nearby Hiking Trails in Santa Clara County – San Jose Wiki
 Map of the St. Joseph's Hill Open Space Preserve (includes the southern end of the Los Gatos Creek Trail)
 Los Gatos Creek Trail entire path in video+map on Kinomap
 gmap route
 Maps from the Town of Los Gatos

Bike paths in San Jose, California
Protected areas of Santa Clara County, California
Trails in the San Francisco Bay Area
Transportation in Santa Clara County, California
Hiking trails in California